The following article presents a summary of the 1927 football (soccer) season in Brazil, which was the 26th season of competitive football in the country.

Campeonato Paulista

In 1927 there were two different editions of the Campeonato Paulista. One was organized by the Associação Paulista de Esportes Atléticos (APEA) while the other one was organized by the Liga de Amadores de Futebol (LAF).

APEA's Campeonato Paulista

Final Stage

Palestra Itália-SP was declared APEA's Campeonato Paulista champion.

LAF's Campeonato Paulista

Final Standings

Paulistano was declared LAF's Campeonato Paulista champion.

State championship champions

Other competition champions

Brazil national team
The Brazil national football team did not play any matches in 1927.

References

 Brazilian competitions at RSSSF
 1923-1932 Brazil national team matches at RSSSF

 
Seasons in Brazilian football
Brazil